Sir Otto Herzberg Frankel FRS FAA FRSNZ (4 November 1900, Vienna – 21 November 1998, Canberra) was an Austrian-born New Zealand and Australian geneticist. In the 1960s and 1970s he was among the first to warn of the dangers of plant biodiversity loss.

Early life and family 

Otto Herzberg-Frankel was the third of four sons of a prominent and wealthy lawyer. Otto's paternal grandfather, a well-known author, added Herzberg from his mother's name to become Herzberg-Frankel. After his father's death, Otto dropped the hyphen.

Ludwig Herzberg-Frankel, Otto's father, was a highly successful barrister in Vienna.  He was related to Lewis Namier, who played a significant role in Otto's career.

Max, Otto's oldest brother (1895–1983), qualified in law but after joining Otto in New Zealand in 1938 he became an accountant. Theo (1897–1986), who had to flee Vienna hurriedly in 1938, became a progressive paper manufacturer in Great Britain, establishing the Scottish Pulp and Paper Mills enterprise in the Scottish Highlands. Paul (1903–1992) also moved to Britain, from Poland in 1937. An economist by training, he founded Petroleum Economics Ltd. in 1955 and became a distinguished international authority on the oil industry.

In Otto's early years, his father employed a tutor for his sons as well as a French governess. From 1910 to 1918 Otto attended the Piaristen Staatsgymnasiums Wien VIII, where he met Karl Popper.  Otto claimed to have had no education, as this was a classical rather than a modern school, with poor mathematics and next to no science but eight years of Latin and four of Greek.  None of his teachers inspired him.

Frankel married twice. His first wife was Mathilde Donsbach (1899–1989). They married in the mid-1920s and divorced in 1937. In 1939, he married Margaret Anderson (1902–1997); the engineer John Anderson was her grandfather. From 1929 to 1951, he was employed at Lincoln College and lived in Christchurch. Otto and Margaret Frankel commissioned the architect Ernst Plischke to design their house in the Christchurch suburb of Opawa; Frankel House is a Category 2 entry on the Heritage New Zealand register.

University education 

The end of school coincided with the end of World War I, when there was little chance of a young man without military service being admitted to the University of Vienna.  However, under Otto's leadership, a group of young people took over a disused military laboratory, got a copy of the practical course work from the Chemical Institute of the University, worked through it together without any lectures and subsequently gained credit for the course.

Otto then went to University of Munich to be interviewed by the professor of chemistry there, Richard Willstätter.  He was admitted to the university (1919–1920) to study chemistry, botany and physics. However, after three semesters he lost his enthusiasm for chemistry, preferring something more practical like agriculture.

He went to the Agricultural Institute of the University of Giessen and he studied there under Professor Paul Gisevius for two semesters in 1920/21. Otto disliked him and left. His aunt persuaded him to go back to university, with her support.

In the autumn of 1922 he joined at the Agricultural University of Berlin, having been given credit for his earlier studies in Vienna, Munich and Giessen, as well as for his practical work on his family's farm.  He attended a lecture on plant genetics by Professor Erwin Baur.  He was challenged by Baur's claim to be able to work with genes and the genetic combinations of plants exactly like the chemist with his molecules and his formulae. Otto asked Baur in 1923 if he could begin research under him before his diploma was completed.

His research problem was one of the earliest studies of genetic linkage in plants. Baur suggested that he clarify the linkage relations between one specific mutant (A, fuchsin red) and another nine mutants in Antirrhinum majus, the common snap dragon. In this Otto was unlucky because, after an extensive crossing and back-crossing programme, he found that all but one of the mutations segregated independently of A, and to a large extent of one another. However, the introduction to his thesis was a comprehensive review of linkage in plants that brought high praise from Baur and earned his doctorate from the University of Berlin in 1925.

Career 
Otto worked for two years (1925–1927) as a plant breeder on a large private estate at Dioseg, near Bratislava.

Lewis Namier persuaded Otto to emigrate to Palestine to help establish a plant and animal breeding programme there and to act as a bridge between the Zionist Organization and the Empire Marketing Board under the direction of John Boyd Orr.  There, Otto began his cytological career by counting the chromosomes of the Jaffa orange.  He did not like Palestine and moved to England.

He was elected a Fellow of the Royal Society in 1953.

Conservation of biodiversity
Beginning in 1964 Frankel worked as a member of the International Biological Program (IBP) focusing on the issue of genetic resources. ('Genetic resources' is a term coined by Frankel and Erna Bennett after a nearly all night brainstorming session to find a neutral term at the 2nd International Conference (1967) on Crop Plant Exploration and Conservation, FAO, Rome). In this role, he chaired a joint committee of experts the UN Food and Agriculture Organization organised several international conferences, and worked to raise awareness of the issue of biodiversity loss among scientists, the international community, and the public.

In 1981 he co-wrote the book 'Conservation and Evolution' with Michael E. Soulé.

In 1995 he co-wrote the book 'The conservation of plant biodiversity' with Anthony H. D. Brown and Jeremy James Burdon.

References

External links
Australian Academy of Science

1900 births
1998 deaths
Austrian emigrants to Australia
Austrian scientists
Australian people of Austrian-Jewish descent
Australian geneticists
Fellows of the Royal Society
Knights Bachelor
Fellows of the Australian Academy of Science
Farrer Medal recipients
Fellows of the Royal Society of New Zealand
Foreign associates of the National Academy of Sciences